Nadia Adjoa Owusu (born February 23, 1981) is an American writer and memoirist. She won a 2019 Whiting Award for her memoir Aftershocks.

She graduated from Pace University, Hunter College, and Mountainview College.

Personal life 
Nadia Owusu was born on February 23, 1981, in Dar es Salaam, Tanzania. Her parents were Almas Janikian and Osei Owusu. Almas’ maternal grandparents had fled Turkey during the Armenian genocide, eventually settling in Watertown, Massachusetts. Owusu's father was from southern Ghana and part of the Ashanti tribe. Since Owusu's father worked for the United Nations, she moved a lot as a child; living in England, Italy, Ethiopia and Uganda. Owusu has lived in New York since she was 18.

Works 
 Aftershocks, A Memoir, New York, Simon & Schuster, 2020. 
 So Devilish a Fire Brooklyn, NY : TAR Chapbook series, 2017.

References

External links 

 Official website
 Nadia Owusu Examines Her Ghanaian-Armenian Identity In 'Aftershocks'

1981 births
Living people
American people of Tanzanian descent
American people of Armenian descent
21st-century American memoirists
American women memoirists